Shahbaz Khel is a village of Lakki Marwat District, in the southern part of the Khyber Pakhtunkhwa Province, Pakistan. It is located at 32°36'36N 71°31'40E with an altitude of 890 meters , and is situated in the north-west of the district, lying between Titter Khel and Darra Pezu.

It is the main village of the Union council of Darra Pezu.

References

Lakki Marwat District